Stephanie Broomhall (née Mortimer; born 2 October 1981) is a former rugby union player. She was in the squad that won the 2006 Rugby World Cup. She was named NZ Woman's player of the year in 2004.Black Fern No. 114

Biography 
Broomhall made her international debut on 4 October 2003 against a World XV's team at Auckland.

Broomhall featured for the Black Ferns at the 2005 Canada Cup. She scored a brace of tries in their 32–5 victory against Canada. In 2006, She busted her knee playing for her Christchurch club.

In 2022, she joined Canterbury's Farah Palmer Cup coaching team.

Personal life 
Broomhall has four children and a stepson. Her brother-in-law is former All Black, Sam Broomhall.

References

External links
Black Ferns Profile

1981 births
Living people
New Zealand women's international rugby union players
New Zealand female rugby union players
Female rugby union players